The 2010 Red Deer municipal election was held Monday, October 18, 2010. Since 1968, provincial legislation has required every municipality to hold triennial elections. The citizens of Red Deer, Alberta, elected one mayor, eight councillors (all at large) to the Red Deer City Council, the seven Red Deer School District No. 104 trustees (at large), and five of the Red Deer Catholic Regional Division No. 39's seven trustees (as Red Deer Ward). Based on the mayoral vote turnout, of the estimated 59,942 eligible voters, the voter turnout was 23.9%.

Results
Bold indicates elected, and incumbents are italicized.

Mayor

Councillors

Public School Trustees

Separate School Trustees

References

External links
The City of Red Deer: Election 2010

2010 Alberta municipal elections
2010